Coordinate may refer to:
 An element of a coordinate system in geometry and related domains
 Coordinate space in mathematics
 Cartesian coordinate system
 Coordinate (vector space)
 Geographic coordinate system
 Coordinate structure in linguistics
 Coordinate covalent bond in chemistry 
 Coordinate descent, an algorithm

See also 
 Coordination (disambiguation)
 Coordinator (disambiguation)